Darth Bane: Rule of Two, the sequel to the novel Darth Bane: Path of Destruction, is part of the Star Wars expanded universe. It was written by Drew Karpyshyn, and was released on December 26, 2007. The novel centers on the young Sith apprentice Darth Zannah, recently taken under the wing of the Sith Lord Darth Bane. The "Rule of Two" of the title refers to the rule that there be only two Sith in existence at one time: a Master and an Apprentice, a rule that Bane originates.

Plot 

Darth Bane, still on the planet Ruusan, finds his apprentice Zannah, a girl only 10 years old. Together they decide to see the effects of the thought bomb, and journey into the catacombs where it lies. Inside they find a boy, Tomcat, who is Zannah's cousin, who challenges Bane to a duel. Knowing Bane will kill Tomcat, Zannah spares his life by using the Force to cause his hand to explode. 

Ten years later, Zannah is a woman and now a powerful Sith. Strikingly attractive, she tricks a handsome Twilek named Kel into a plan to assassinate former chancellor Valorum. Kel and other members of the rebel group attack, but two members flee upon seeing his bodyguard is Jedi Knight Johun Othone. After a fearsome battle, the Jedi narrowly defeats Kel, and kills the rest of the group. Meanwhile, at base camp, Bane has been trying to construct a Sith holocron; after three failed attempts, he fails again on the fourth one and goes into a blinding fury. Zannah plants the idea in his head that the orbalisks, a parasitic creature found on Dxun which feeds on dark energy, caused the failure. The orbalisks, which have a lightsaber-proof shell and provide the afflicted person with additional Force energy power, had attached themselves to Bane when he went to Dxun to retrieve a Sith holocron made by Freedon Nadd. He now wonders whether the orbalisks are causing his mind to degrade. 

The two members of the rebel group who had fled find Zannah and accuse her of tricking them into an attack that was doomed to fail.  Unable to attack in public, she goes with them to see their master, Hetton. In him, Zannah senses the dark side of the Force. She kills the two members that fled in a dramatic flair of Sith power. Hetton, very impressed, asks Zannah to make him her apprentice. She accepts, knowing that he has a large collection of manuscripts valuable to her master. After killing Hetton, Bane uses Hetton's manuscripts and finds the location of the tomb of Sith Lord Belia Darzu. Hoping that it will contain the secrets of holocron construction, he travels there. 

Bane instructs Zannah to disguise herself and go to the Jedi archives, to see if she can find a way to remove the interfering orbalisks. There she finds the cure, but stumbles upon her cousin Tomcat, now called Darovit. Darovit has told the Jedi about Darth Bane surviving the thought bomb on Ruusan. He now finds himself changing alliances and decides to come with Zannah because of his brotherly love for her. Five Jedi journey to the tomb of Belia Darzu, arriving after Zannah and Darovit. Bane instructs Darovit to hide, and he and Zannah together duel with the five Jedi. After the Sith slay four of the Jedi, Bane attempts to kill the last one with Force lightning.  One of the four supposedly slain Jedi is still barely alive, and casts a Force orb around Bane as he releases the lightning.  The lightning is reflected back on Bane, frying him inside the orb. Most of the orbalisks are destroyed by the tremendous power of the Force lightning, and release a toxin that will kill Bane in days. Zannah takes Bane and Darovit to Ambria, to find the healer Caleb, who once before saved Bane's life. Caleb refuses to heal him, having sent his daughter, Serra, away after his first encounter with Bane. But he makes a deal with Zannah that he will heal Bane if Zannah informs the Jedi of their existence. She accepts, but after Bane is healed, Zannah kills Caleb and causes Darovit to go mad with her Sith sorcery. When the Jedi arrive on Ambria, Zannah sends a now insane Darovit to attack them with a lightsaber, tricking the Jedi into thinking that Darovit was the Sith Lord. The Jedi cut down Darovit, and then depart Ambria, believing that the Sith are now truly dead in the galaxy. Meanwhile, Zannah and Bane are hiding in a secret cellar. Bane expected her to let him die, but after the Jedi Knights leave, she tells him that she saved him because she still has much to learn.

Characters

 Darth Bane, real name Dessel
 Darth Zannah, childhood name "Rain"
 Darovit, childhood name "Tomcat"
 Johun Othone
 Valenthyne Farfalla

Reception
Darth Bane: Rule of Two reached 14 on the New York Times bestseller list on January 13, 2008.

References

External links 
 

2007 Canadian novels
2007 science fiction novels
Star Wars Legends novels
Canadian science fiction novels
Del Rey books